The 2003 Atlantic Coast Conference men's basketball tournament took place from March 13–16 in Greensboro, North Carolina, at the Greensboro Coliseum. The 2003 edition marked the 50th ACC Tournament. Duke won the tournament for the fifth straight time, defeating NC State in the championship game for the second year in a row. Duke's Daniel Ewing won the tournament's Most Valuable Player award.

Bracket

AP Rankings at time of tournament

External links
 

Tournament
ACC men's basketball tournament
College sports in North Carolina
Basketball competitions in Greensboro, North Carolina
ACC men's basketball tournament
ACC men's basketball tournament